Guo Dandan  (born 5 August 1977) is a Chinese freestyle skier. She was born in Fushun. She competed at the 1998 Winter Olympics, in women's aerials.

References

External links 
 

1977 births
People from Fushun
Living people
Chinese female freestyle skiers
Olympic freestyle skiers of China
Freestyle skiers at the 1998 Winter Olympics
Asian Games medalists in freestyle skiing
Freestyle skiers at the 1996 Asian Winter Games
Asian Games gold medalists for China
Medalists at the 1996 Asian Winter Games
Skiers from Liaoning